Nostell railway station served the village of Nostell, West Yorkshire, England from 1866 to 1951 on the West Riding and Grimsby Railway.

History 
The station opened on 1 February 1866 by the Great Northern Railway. It station closed to both passengers and goods traffic on 29 October 1951.

References

External links 

Disused railway stations in Wakefield
Former West Riding and Grimsby Railway stations
Railway stations in Great Britain opened in 1866
Railway stations in Great Britain closed in 1951
1866 establishments in England
1951 disestablishments in England